Jean-Marie Repaire (born 17 October 1947) is a Monegasque sports shooter. He competed in the mixed trap event at the 1984 Summer Olympics.

References

1947 births
Living people
Monegasque male sport shooters
Olympic shooters of Monaco
Shooters at the 1984 Summer Olympics
Place of birth missing (living people)